The Institut National Agronomique Paris-Grignon (INA P-G) was a French university-level institution of grande école-type. It offered master's degree in agricultural- and life sciences. It was created in 1971 by merging the Institut national agronomique (Paris) and the École nationale supérieure d'Agronomie de Grignon, thus having a history that goes back to 1826.

INA P-G disappeared as an administrative entity on January 1, 2007, along with ENSIA and ENGREF, to create AgroParisTech.

Points of interest
 Arboretum de Grignon
 Jardin botanique de l'Institut National

External links

  Official website
  Official website
  Official website of AgroParisTech
 

1826 establishments in France
2007 disestablishments in France
Grandes écoles
Educational institutions established in 1826
Educational institutions established in 1971
Educational institutions disestablished in 2007